Turnham is a surname. Notable people with the surname include:

Stephen Turnham Pratt, American physicist studying electron-nuclear coupling
Floyd Turnham (1909–1991), American R&B saxophonist
George Albert Turnham (1859–1948), American businessman and politician
Joe Turnham (born 1959), American politician
Laura Turnham or Lora Fachie, OBE (born 1988), visually impaired English racing cyclist
Pete Turnham (1920–2019), American politician

See also
Turnham Green, public park on Chiswick High Road, Chiswick, London, England, United Kingdom
Thurnham (disambiguation)